Lucca is a city and comune in Tuscany, Central Italy, on the Serchio River, in a fertile plain near the Ligurian Sea. The city has a population of about 89,000, while its province has a population of 383,957. 

Lucca is known as an Italian "Città d'arte" (Arts town) from its intact Renaissance-era city walls and its very well preserved historic center, where, among other buildings and monuments, are located the Piazza dell'Anfiteatro, which has its origins in the second half of the 1st century A.D. and the Guinigi Tower, a  tower that dates from the 1300s. 

The city is also the birthplace of numerous world-class composers, including Giacomo Puccini, Alfredo Catalani, and Luigi Boccherini.

Toponymy 
By the Romans, Lucca was known as Luca. From more recent and concrete toponymic studies, the name Lucca has references that lead to "sacred wood" (Latin: lucus), "to cut" (Latin: lucare) and "luminous space" (leuk, a term used by the first European populations). The origin apparently refers to a wooded area deforested to make room for light or to a clearing located on a river island of Serchio debris, in the middle of wooded areas.

History

Antiquity 
The territory of present-day Lucca was certainly settled by the Etruscans, having also traces of a probable earlier Ligurian presence (called Luk meaning "marsh", which has already been speculated as a possible origin for the city's name), dating from 3rd century BC. However, it was only with the arrival of the Romans, that the area took on the appearance of a real town, obtaining the status of a Roman colony in 180 BC, and transformed into a town hall in 89 BC.

The rectangular grid of its historical centre preserves the Roman street plan, and the Piazza San Michele occupies the site of the ancient forum. The outline of the Roman amphitheatre is still seen in the Piazza dell'Anfiteatro, and the outline of a Roman theater is visible in Piazza Sant'Augostino. Fragments of the Roman-era walls are incorporated into the church of Santa Maria della Rosa.

At the Lucca Conference, in 56 BC, Julius Caesar, Pompey, and Crassus reaffirmed their political alliance known as the First Triumvirate.

Middle Ages 

Frediano, an Irish monk, was bishop of Lucca in the early sixth century. At one point, Lucca was plundered by Odoacer, the first Germanic King of Italy. Lucca was an important city and fortress even in the sixth century, when Narses besieged it for several months in 553. From 576 to 797, under the Lombards, it was the capital of a duchy, known as Ducato di Tuscia, which included a large part of today's Tuscany and the province of Viterbo, during this time the city also minted its own coins. The Holy Face of Lucca (or Volto Santo), a major relic supposedly carved by Nicodemus, arrived in 742.   

Among the population that inhabited Lucca in the medieval era, there was also a significant presence of Jews. The first mention of their presence in the city is from a document from the year 859. The jewish community was led by the Kalonymos family (which later became a major component of proto-Ashkenazic Jewry).  

Thanks above all to the Holy Face and to the relics of important saints, such as San Regolo and Saint Fridianus, the city was one of the main destinations of the Via Francigena, the major pilgrimage route to Rome from the north.

The Lucca cloth was a silk fabric that was woven with gold or silver threads. It was a popular type of textile in Lucca throughout the mediaeval period. 

Lucca became prosperous through the silk trade that began in the eleventh century, and came to rival the silks of Byzantium. During the tenth–eleventh centuries Lucca was the capital of the feudal margraviate of Tuscany, more or less independent but owing nominal allegiance to the Holy Roman Emperor. 

In 1057 Anselm of Baggio (later Pope Alexander II) was appointed bishop of Lucca, a position he held also during the papacy. As bishop of Lucca he managed to rebuild the patrimony of the Church of Lucca, recovering alienated assets, obtaining numerous donations thanks to his prestige, and had the Cathedral of the city rebuilt. From 1073 to 1086, the bishop of Lucca was his nephew Anselm II, a prominent figure in the Investiture Controversy.

During the High Middle Ages, one of the most illustrious dynasties of Lucca was the noble Allucingoli family, who managed to forge strong ties with the Church. Among the family members were Ubaldo Allucingoli, who was elected to the Papacy as Pope Lucius III in 1181, and the Cardinals Gerardo Allucingoli and Uberto Allucingoli.

Republican period (12th to 19th century) 

After the death of Matilda of Tuscany, the city began to constitute itself an independent commune with a charter in 1160. For almost 500 years, Lucca remained an independent republic. There were many minor provinces in the region between southern Liguria and northern Tuscany dominated by the Malaspina; Tuscany in this time was a part of feudal Europe. Dante’s Divine Comedy includes many references to the great feudal families who had huge jurisdictions with administrative and judicial rights. Dante spent some of his exile in Lucca.

In 1273 and again in 1277, Lucca was ruled by a Guelph capitano del popolo (captain of the people) named Luchetto Gattilusio. In 1314, internal discord allowed Uguccione della Faggiuola of Pisa to make himself lord of Lucca. The Lucchesi expelled him two years later, and handed over the city to another condottiero, Castruccio Castracani, under whose rule it became a leading state in central Italy. Lucca rivalled Florence until Castracani's death in 1328. On 22 and 23 September 1325, in the battle of Altopascio, Castracani defeated Florence's Guelphs. For this he was nominated by Louis IV the Bavarian to become duke of Lucca. Castracani's tomb is in the church of San Francesco. His biography is Machiavelli's third famous book on political rule.

Occupied by the troops of Louis of Bavaria, the city was sold to a rich Genoese, Gherardino Spinola, then seized by John, king of Bohemia. Pawned to the Rossi of Parma, by them it was ceded to Mastino II della Scala of Verona, sold to the Florentines, surrendered to the Pisans, and then nominally liberated by the emperor Charles IV and governed by his vicar.

In 1408, Lucca hosted a convocation organized by Pope Gregory XII with his cardinals intended to end the schism in the papacy.

Lucca managed, at first as a democracy, and after 1628 as an oligarchy, to maintain its independence alongside of Venice and Genoa, and painted the word Libertas on its banner until the French Revolution in 1789.

Early modern period

Lucca had been the second largest Italian city state (after Venice) with a republican constitution ("comune") to remain independent over the centuries.

Between 1799 and 1800 it was contended by the French and Austrian armies. Finally the French prevailed and granted a democratic constitution in the 1801. However, already in 1805 the Republic of Lucca was converted into a monarchy by Napoleon, who installed his sister Elisa Bonaparte Baciocchi as "Princess of Lucca".

From 1815 to 1847 it was a Bourbon-Parma duchy. The only reigning dukes of Lucca were Maria Luisa of Spain, who was succeeded by her son Charles II, Duke of Parma in 1824. Meanwhile, the Duchy of Parma had been assigned for life to Marie Louise, Duchess of Parma, the second wife of Napoleon. In accordance with the Treaty of Vienna (1815), upon the death of Marie Louise, Duchess of Parma in 1847, Parma reverted to Charles II, Duke of Parma, while Lucca lost independence and was annexed to the Grand Duchy of Tuscany. As part of Tuscany, it became part of the Kingdom of Sardinia in 1860 and finally part of the Italian State in 1861.

World War II internment camp

Its official number was P.G. (prigionieri di guerra) 60, and it was usually referred to as PG 60 Lucca. Although it never had permanent structures and accommodation consisted of tents in an area prone to flooding, it housed more than 3,000 British and Commonwealth prisoners of war during the period of its existence. It was handed over to the Germans on 10 September 1943, not long after the signing of the Italian armistice. During the Italian Social Republic, as a puppet state of the Germans, political prisoners, foreigners, common law prisoners and Jews were interned there, and it functioned as a concentration camp. In June 1944 the prisoners were moved to Bagni di Lucca.

Government

Culture
Lucca is the birthplace of composers Giacomo Puccini (La Bohème and Madama Butterfly), Nicolao Dorati, Francesco Geminiani, Gioseffo Guami, Luigi Boccherini, and Alfredo Catalani. It is also the birthplace of artist Benedetto Brandimarte. Since 2004, Lucca is home to IMT Lucca, a public research institution and a selective graduate school and part of the Superior Graduate Schools in Italy (Grandes écoles).

Events
Lucca hosts the annual Lucca Summer Festival. The 2006 edition featured live performances by Eric Clapton, Placebo, Massive Attack, Roger Waters, Tracy Chapman, and Santana at the Piazza Napoleone.

Lucca hosts the annual Lucca Comics and Games festival, Europe's largest festival for comics, movies, games and related subjects.

Other events include:
 Lucca Film Festival
 Lucca Digital Photography Fest
 Procession of Santa Croce, on 13 September. Costume procession through the town's roads. 
 Lucca Jazz Donna
Moreover, Lucca hosts Lucca Biennale Cartasia, an international biennial contemporary art exhibition focusing solely on Paper Art.

Film and television
Mauro Bolognini's 1958 film Giovani mariti, with Sylva Koscina, is set and was filmed in Lucca.

Top Gear filmed the third episode of the 17th season here.

Architecture 
Lucca is also known for its marble deposits. After a fire in the early 1900s, the West Wing of the Legislative Assembly of Ontario was rebuilt with marble sourced in Lucca. The floor mosaic in the West Wing was hand-laid and is constructed entirely of Italian, Lucca marble.

Main sights

Walls, streets, and squares
The walls encircling the old town remain intact, even though the city has expanded and been modernised, which is unusual for cities in this region. These walls were built initially as a defensive rampart which, after losing their military importance, became a pedestrian promenade (the Passeggiata delle Mure Urbane) atop the walls which not only links the Bastions of Santa Croce, San Frediano, San Martino, San Pietro/Battisti, San Salvatore, La Libertà/Cairoli, San Regolo, San Colombano, Santa Maria, San Paolino/Catalani and San Donato but also passes over the gates (Porte) of San Donato, Santa Maria, San Jacopo, Elisa, San Pietro, and Sant'Anna. Each of the four principal sides of the structure is lined with a tree species different from the others.

The walled city is encircled by Piazzale Boccherini, Viale Lazzaro Papi, Viale Carlo Del Prete, Piazzale Martiri della Libertà, Via Batoni, Viale Agostino Marti, Viale G. Marconi (vide Guglielmo Marconi), Piazza Don A. Mei, Viale Pacini, Viale Giusti, Piazza Curtatone, Piazzale Ricasoli, Viale Ricasoli, Piazza Risorgimento (vide Risorgimento), and Viale Giosuè Carducci.

The town includes a number of public squares, most notably the Piazza dell'Anfiteatro, (site of the ancient Roman amphitheater), the Piazzale Verdi, the Piazza Napoleone, and the Piazza San Michele.

Palaces, villas, houses, offices, and museums
Ducal Palace: built on the site of Castruccio Castracani's fortress. Construction was begun by Ammannati in 1577–1582 and continued by Juvarra in the eighteenth century
Pfanner Palace
Villa Garzoni, noted for its water gardens
Casa di Puccini: House of the opera composer, at the nearby Torre del Lago, where the composer spent his summers. A Puccini opera festival takes place every July–August 
Torre delle Ore: ("The Clock Tower")
Guinigi Tower and House: Panoramic view from tower-top balcony with oak trees
National Museum of Villa Guinigi
National Museum of Palazzo Mansi
Orto Botanico Comunale di Lucca: botanical garden dating from 1820
Academy of Sciences (1584) 
Teatro del Giglio: nineteenth-century opera house

Churches
There are many medieval, a few as old as the eighth century, basilica-form churches with richly arcaded façades and campaniles
Duomo di San Martino: St Martin's Cathedral
San Michele in Foro: Romanesque church
San Giusto: Romanesque church
Basilica di San Frediano
SanSan Romano, Luccat'Alessandro an example of medieval classicism
Santa Giulia: Lombard church rebuilt in thirteenth century
San Michele: church at Antraccoli, founded in 777, it was enlarged and rebuilt in the twelfth century with the introduction of a sixteenth-century portico
San Giorgio church in the locality of Brancoli, built in the late twelfth century has a bell tower in Lombard-Romanesque style, the interior houses a massive ambo (1194) with four columns mounted on lion sculptures, a highly decorated Romanesque octagonal baptismal fount, and the altar is supported by six small columns with human figures
San Lorenzo di Moriano, a 12th century Romanesque style parish church
San Romano, erected by the Dominican order in the second half of the 13th century, is today a deconsecrated Roman Catholic Church located on Piazza San Romano in the center of Lucca

Museums
 Museo della Cattedrale
 Orto Botanico Comunale di Lucca

Education
Since 2005, Lucca hosts IMT School for Advanced Studies Lucca, a selective graduate and doctoral school which is part of the Italian superior graduate school system. Its main educational facilities are located at the San Francesco Convent Complex and Campus, and the former Renaissance-style Roman Catholic church of San Ponziano now hosts the university library.

Sports
Association Football arrived in Lucca in 1905 and has its roots in Brazil, thanks to a number of fans that helped found the club who had learned the game in Brazil. The Lucchese 1905, or simply Lucchese, play in Serie C, the third tier of Italian football, having last been in top tier Serie A in 1952. The club plays their home games at Stadio Porta Elisa, just outside the northeast wall of the city.

Transportation

Buses
Consorzio Lucchese Autotrasporti Pubblici, also known as CLAP, was established in 1969, as the main company in the Province of Lucca to manage the local public transport.
In 2005, following the decision of the Region to assign the local public transport to a single operator for each of the 14 lots constituted, CLAP merged with the companies Lazzi and C.LU.B. Scpa to form the consortium VaiBus which was absorbed by the newly formed company CTT Nord in 2012. VaiBus was part of ONE Scarl the consortium holder of the two-year (2018-2019) contract for the management of the TPL throughout the Region.

Since 1 November 2021 the public local transport is managed by Autolinee Toscane.

Notable people

 St. Anselm of Lucca, (1036–1086), the bishop of Lucca
 Giovanni Arnolfini (1400–1472), a merchant and patron of the arts
 Pompeo Batoni (1708–1787), painter
 Giovanni Antonio Bianchi (1686–1768), an Italian minor friar, theologian, and Tuscan poet
 Simone Bianchi (born 1972), comics artist
 Luigi Boccherini (1743–1805), musician and composer
 Elisa Bonaparte, ruler of Lucca
 Anthony Bonvisi, merchant and banker in London 
 Giulio Carmassi (born 1981), composer
 Castruccio Castracani, ruler of Lucca (1316–1328)
 Alfredo Catalani (1854–1893), composer
 Gusmano Cesaretti, photographer and artist
 Mario Cipollini (born 1967), cyclist
 Alfredo Ciucci (born 1920), football player
 Matteo Civitali (1436–1501), sculptor
 Ivan Della Mea (1940–2009), singer-songwriter
 Theodoric Borgognoni (1205–1296/8), medieval surgeon
 Marco Antonio Franciotti (1592–1666), bishop of Lucca 
 Ernesto Filippi (born 1950), football referee
 Saint Frediano
 St. Gemma Galgani, mystic and saint
 Francesco Geminiani (1687–1762), musician and composer
 Giovanni Battista Giusti, harpsichord maker
 Gioseffo Guami (1542–1611), composer
 Leo I, saint
 Pope Lucius III (1097–1185)
 Vincenzo Lunardi (1754–1806), an aeronautical pioneer aeronaut
 Ludovico Marracci (1612–1700), priest and first translator of the Qur'an into Latin
 Felice Matteucci (1808–1887), engineer
 Mazzino Montinari (1928–1986), germanicist and Nietzsche scholar
 Italo Meschi (1887–1957), harp guitarist, poet, anarchist-pacifist
 Julian Niccolini, restaurateur
 Leo Nomellini (1924–2000), athlete
 Mario Pannunzio (1910–1968), journalist and politician
 Marcello Pera (born 1943), politician and philosopher
 Giacomo Puccini (1858–1924), composer
 Eros Riccio (born 1977), chess player
 Marco Rossi, footballer
 Daniele Rugani (born 1994), footballer
 Renato Salvatori, actor
 Carlo Sforza (1872–1952), diplomat and politician
 Rinaldo and Ezilda Torre, founded the Torani syrup company in San Francisco using Luccan recipes from their hometown
 Nicola Fanucchi (born 1964), actor and director
 Rolando Ugolini (1924–2014), athlete
 Giuseppe Ungaretti, poet
 Antonio Vallisneri, scientist and physician
 Alfredo Volpi (1896–1988), painter
 Hugh of Lucca, medieval surgeon 
 Saint Zita

Sister cities

Lucca is twinned with:

 Abingdon, England, United Kingdom
 Colmar, France
 Gorinchem, The Netherlands
 Hämeenlinna, Finland
 Schongau, Germany
 Sint-Niklaas, Belgium
 South San Francisco, United States

See also
Castruccio Castracani
Duchy of Lucca
Republic of Lucca
Walls of Lucca

Footnotes

Bibliography

External links

 Municipality website
 National Museum of Villa Guinigi
 Museum of Villa Mansi
 Lu.C.C.A. Museum of the Archaeology of the Lucca Cathedral 

 
Cities and towns in Tuscany
Fortified settlements
Roman sites of Tuscany
Capitals of former nations
Populated places established in the 3rd century BC